East Mani ( - Anatolikí Máni) is a municipality in Laconia, Peloponnese, Greece. Its seat of administration is the town Gytheio (before 2011 the small town Kotronas). The municipality covers the southeastern part of the Mani region. It is a mountainous and rocky area. Its economy relies on fishing, olive oil and tourism.

History 
The town of Kotronas was founded in around 1500 BC. It emerged to become a major port. Kotronas was named by Homer.  Part of the Mycenaean navy that sent out to Troy was stationed there.  When the Dorians took over Mani, Laconia and parts of Messenia, Kotronas' role as a major port was replaced by Gytheio. In the Roman period, Teuthrone, the ancient name of Kotronas, was a member of the Koinon of Free Laconians. Kotronas suffered greatly from pirate raids.

Municipality
The municipality East Mani was formed at the 2011 local government reform by the merger of the following 4 former municipalities, that became municipal units:
East Mani
Gytheio
Oitylo
Sminos

The municipality has an area of 619.277 km2, the municipal unit 108.879 km2.

Population 
The population development of the municipal unit and the larger municipality East Mani are listed below.

See also 

 List of settlements in Laconia

References

External links 
 Greek Travel Pages
 Dimos Anatolikis Manis

 
Populated places established in the 2nd millennium BC
Cities in ancient Peloponnese
Municipalities of Peloponnese (region)
Populated places in Laconia
Mani Peninsula